Raymond Nasso (born 3 July 1987) is an Australian-Italian rugby league footballer who played in the 2010s. He played at club level for the London Broncos in the 2015 Kingstone Press Championship season and represented Italy in the 2013 World Cup. Nowadays, he works at a high school as a pdhpe teacher.

Playing career
He played for SO Avignon in the Elite One Championship as a hooker. He started play in France at Villefranche-de-Rouergue for Villefranche XIII Aveyron in the Elite Two Championship. On 9 July 2014, Nasso signed for the London Broncos for the 2015 and 2016 seasons from Sporting Olympique Avignon.

References

1987 births
Living people
Australian people of Italian descent
Australian rugby league players
Australian schoolteachers
Italy national rugby league team players
London Broncos players
Oxford Rugby League players
Rugby league hookers
Rugby league players from Sydney
Sporting Olympique Avignon players
Villefranche XIII Aveyron players